Return to Forever is a jazz fusion album by Chick Corea, simultaneously functioning as the debut album by the band of the same name. Unlike later albums by the group, it was released by the ECM label and produced by Manfred Eicher. The album was not released in the USA until 1975. The record is often considered one of the classic albums in electric jazz.

Track listing 
All tracks are composed by Chick Corea; except where noted.

Personnel 
Musicians
 Chick Corea – Fender Rhodes electric piano
 Stanley Clarke – electric bass guitar (tracks 1-3), double bass (track 4)
 Joe Farrell – flute, soprano saxophone
 Airto Moreira – drums, percussion
 Flora Purim – vocals, percussion

Production
 Manfred Eicher – producer
 Tony May – engineer
 Michael Manoogian - cover photography

Chart performance

References

External links 
 Chick Corea - Return to Forever (1972) album releases & credits at Discogs
 Chick Corea - Return to Forever (1972) album to be listened as stream on Spotify

1972 albums
Return to Forever albums
Chick Corea albums
ECM Records albums
Albums produced by Manfred Eicher